Conjunction introduction (often abbreviated simply as conjunction and also called and introduction or adjunction) is a valid rule of inference of propositional logic. The rule makes it possible to introduce a conjunction into a logical proof. For example, if it is true that "it is raining", and it is true that "the cat is inside", then it is true that "it is raining and the cat is inside". The rule can be stated:

where the rule is that wherever an instance of "" and "" appear on lines of a proof, a "" can be placed on a subsequent line.

Formal notation 
The conjunction introduction rule may be written in sequent notation:

 

References

Rules of inference
Theorems in propositional logic